Marlon Gibbs (born 30 March 1971) is a Jamaican cricketer. He played in five first-class and nine List A matches for the Jamaican cricket team from 1995 to 1997.

See also
 List of Jamaican representative cricketers

References

External links
 

1971 births
Living people
Jamaican cricketers
Jamaica cricketers